Mohan Shumsher Jang Bahadur Rana formed the first government of Nepal after the 1951 democracy movement. The government was formed by the proclamation of King Tribhuvan on 17 February 1951 and incorporated members of the Rana regime and the Nepali Congress. The king retained the right to dissolve the cabinet at any time and the cabinet would be responsible to him and the prime minister was to inform the king of all decisions.

Mohan Shumsher resigned on 12 November 1951 after Nepali Congress ministers in the cabinet resigned after calling the alliance between the two groups "unnatural".

Cabinet

February 1951–May 1951

May 1951–November 1951

References 

1951 in Nepal
Cabinet of Nepal
Cabinets established in 1951
Cabinets disestablished in 1951
1951 establishments in Nepal
1951 disestablishments in Nepal